is an extended play release by Dragon Ash, originally released on 12-inch vinyl in 2000. The title track was the ending theme for the popular Japanese film Battle Royale, also released in 2000. A version of the song appeared on their 2001 album Lily of da Valley.

Track listing

Side A
"静かな日々の階段を" (E.P. version) (Shizuka na Hibi no Kaidan o) – 4:16
"静かな日々の階段を" (E.P. version instrumental) (Shizuka na Hibi no Kaidan o) – 4:16

Side B
"静かな日々の階段を" (Shizuka na Hibi no Kaidan o) – 4:30
"静かな日々の階段を" (instrumental) (Shizuka na Hibi no Kaidan o) – 4:30

See also
Battle Royale Original Soundtrack

References

2000 singles
Dragon Ash songs
2000 songs
Victor Entertainment singles